Llefià is a Barcelona Metro station named after the neighbourhood of the same name where the station is situated, near Llefià Market, in Badalona municipality. This neighbourhood is one of Badalona's with highest population density and built in a very uneven piece of land. The station was opened on 18 April 2010 with the opening of the line from Gorg to Bon Pastor. It is served by TMB-operated Barcelona Metro line L10.

Layout
The station is located under the intersection between Ronda Sant Antoni de Llefià and Avinguda d'Amèrica and it was built like many other new L9/L10 metro stations with a 32-meter depth and 26 meter diameter well. The station is divided in four levels: the upper hall, the pre-platform, the upper platform and the lower platform. The upper hall is located at the same level as the street, in a building built specifically for this purpose. It has three accesses from the street, all equipped with fixed stairs, escalators and elevators, and making the station accessible for disabled persons. The upper hall has also ticket vending machines and a TMB Control Center. The upper platform is where run the trains towards La Sagrera and the lower platform is where run the trains towards Gorg. The architectural design of the station was designed by architect Alfons Soldevila Barbosa.

Gallery

References

External links

 The station listing at TMB website
 Information and photos about the station at Trenscat.com
 Photo gallery of Llefià and La Salut metro stations
 Overview of the station in a video from YouTube
 View of the building under construction from Google Maps Street View

Railway stations in Spain opened in 2010
Railway stations in Badalona
Barcelona Metro line 10 stations